Sahib Abbas Hassan (born 3 November 1969) is an Iraqi former professional footballer who played as a striker. He represented Iraq at the 1996 Asian Cup, and also played for various clubs in Iraq, Lebanon, Jordan, Bahrain, and Syria. The player's tally of 177 goals in the Iraqi Premier League is an all-time record.

Club career 
Sahib Abbas was considered one of the best Iraqi strikers of his generation. After beginning his career at Karbalaa, Abbas moved to Salahaddin in 1991, playing as the main-choice striker. In 1993 he moved to Al-Zawraa—where he made his name—helping the club, featuring the likes Hussam Fawzi and Essam Hamad, to two consecutive league and cup doubles in 1995 and 1996.

In 1998, he joined top Lebanese club Al-Nejmeh, playing there for a season without hitting the headlines. After an unimpressive season with the ‘Reds’, he joined lowly club Salam Zghorta in 1999, a team battling to keep its 1st division status. Thanks to Sahib’s devastating performances the club avoided relegated with Sahib scoring 14 goals in 22 games, quite an achievement considering the team only scored 32 goals all season. After becoming Lebanese joint top scorer with Al-Ansar’s Brazilian Toninho Cruz, winning the Golden Boot, he returned to Iraq and joining Al-Talaba, winning a league and cup double in 2002.

He continued to play for clubs in Jordan, Bahrain and Syria and in 2012, Sahib finally hung up his boots with his home city club Karbala finishing his career with a record 177 Iraqi league goals.

International career 
Abbas was a member of the 1996 Asian Cup squad and the 1998 World Cup qualifying team.

Career statistics

International
Scores and results list Iraq's goal tally first, score column indicates score after each Abbas goal.

Honours 
Al-Zawra
 Iraqi Premier League: 1993–94, 1994–95, 1995–96
 Iraq FA Cup: 1993–94, 1994–95, 1995–96, 1997–98

Al-Talaba
 Iraqi Premier League: 2001–02
 Iraq FA Cup: 2001–02

Al-Ahli Manama
 Bahraini King's Cup: 2003

Al-Shabab Manama
 Bahraini King's Cup: 2004

Individual
 Lebanese Premier League top goalscorer: 1999–2000
 Iraqi Premier League top goalscorer: 2005–06

Records
 Iraqi Premier League all-time goalscorer: 177 goals

Notes

Bibliography

References

External links
 
 
 
 
 Sahib Abbas at Eurosport.com

1969 births
Living people
People from Karbala
Iraqi footballers
Association football forwards
Al-Jamahir SC players
Karbalaa FC players
Salahaddin FC players
Al-Zawraa SC players
Nejmeh SC players
Salam Zgharta FC players
Al-Hussein SC (Irbid) players
Al-Talaba SC players
Al-Ahli Club (Manama) players
Al-Shabab Club (Manama) players
Afrin SC players
Al-Sinaa SC players
Al-Hindiya SC players
Iraqi Premier League players
Lebanese Premier League players
Jordanian Pro League players
Bahraini Premier League players
Iraq international footballers
1996 AFC Asian Cup players
Lebanese Premier League top scorers
Iraqi expatriate footballers
Expatriate footballers in Lebanon
Expatriate footballers in Jordan
Expatriate footballers in Bahrain
Expatriate footballers in Syria
Iraqi expatriate sportspeople in Lebanon
Iraqi expatriate sportspeople in Jordan
Iraqi expatriate sportspeople in Bahrain
Iraqi expatriate sportspeople in Syria